The Liao Civilization or Liao River Civilization, named after the Liao River, is an ancient civilization that originated in the Liao basin. It is thought to have formed in about 6,200 BC. This civilization was discovered when Ryuzo Torii, a Japanese archaeologist, discovered the Hongshan culture in 1908.

Culture
Large-scale pit-type houses, graves and temples with altars were excavated. It is thought that the Liao civilization may have been "a country" of the prehistoric age.

A model of the feng shui were excavated from remains of the Hongshan culture. Ball products such as the jade which made the precursors of Chinese dragon were discovered in remains of Xinglongwa culture. In addition, the oldest pit-comb ware and Liaoning bronze dagger (biwa form bronze sword) were excavated.

Since it was contemporaneous with the Yellow River civilization and Yangtze civilization, it is thought to have influenced ancient Chinese culture.

Environment

This region was thought to have been desert for the past 1 million years. However, a 2015 study found that the region once featured rich aquatic resources and deep lakes and forests that existed from 12,000 years ago to 4,000 years ago. It was changed into desert by climate change which began approximately 4,200 years ago. Therefore, people of the Hongshan culture may have emigrated to the Yellow River in the south approximately 4,000 years ago and later influenced Chinese culture.

People

The most ancient populations of the West Liao River valley exhibited a high frequency of Haplogroup N-M231. A study by Yinqiu Cui et al. from 2013 found that 63% of the combined samples from various Hongshan archeological sites belonged to the subclade N1 (xN1a, N1c) of the paternal haplogroup N-M231 and calculated N to have been the predominant haplogroup in the region in the Neolithic period at 89%, its share gradually declining over time. Today, this haplogroup is most common in Finland, the Baltic states, and among northern Siberian ethnicities, such as the Yakuts. Individuals at the Liao civilization were assigned into five different Y sub-haplogroups using diagnostic single nucleotide polymorphisms, namely N1 (xN1a, N1c), N1c, C/C3e, O3a (O3a3) and O3a3c. Ancient samples of the Jinggouzi site situated to the northwest of the Liao civilization were assigned to Haplogroup C-M217. Northern nomads from Jinggouzi might have entered the West Liao River valley, but these Jinggouzi people (closely related to Xianbei and Oroqen) were culturally and genetically distinct from the original people of the West Liao River valley, who carried the characteristic Haplogroup N-M231 lineage. The Haplogroup O-M122 that was observed among Liao individuals is believed to have spread to the Liao civilization from the Yellow River civilization in the southwest. This lineage is most commonly associated with speakers of Sino-Tibetan languages (such as the Han Chinese). However, its frequency only began to rise in the Bronze Age, and the ancient Liao River population was different from the Yellow River population. This means the Liao civilization was occupied by a diverse sequence of human cultures that were originally distinct from both the farming populations of the Yellow River and the nomads of the Eurasian steppe.

The formation and development of the Lower Xiajiadian culture population was likely a complex process affected by admixture of ethnically different people. The Lower Xiajiadian culture of the West Liao River included people carrying haplogroups from northern Asia, but there was genetic evidence of the migration of millet farming people from the Central Plains (Zhongyuan). The climate of the West Liao River valley was warmer at the beginning of the Early Bronze Age, which may be one of the driving forces for the northward migration of the Central Plains farming population. An archaeological study showed that the painted potteries of the Lower Xiajiadian were influenced by the Erlitou culture. The people of the Dadianzi site of Inner Mongolia received the haplogroup O3 from the immigrants of the Central Plains, and a Lower Xiajiadian individual was identified to possess both the maternal lineage of D4 and paternal lineage of O3-M122. Due to a cooling climate, part of the Lower Xiajiadian culture population migrated to the south and influenced the Central Plains. Among the Yin Ruins relics of Shang Dynasty, artefacts with northern cultural influences have been identified.

List of cultures 
Various Neolithic cultures have been identified in the Xiliao River region. Broomcorn millet and foxtail millet were the main cereal crops, while pigs and dogs were the main domesticated animals found at Neolithic archaeological sites.

Xiaohexi culture 小河西文化 (9,000-8,500 BP)
Xinglongwa culture 兴隆洼文化 (8,200-7,400 BP)
Zhaobaogou culture 赵宝沟文化 (7,500-6,500 BP)
Fuhe culture 富河文化 (7,200-7,000 BP)
Xinle culture (7,200-6,800 BP)
Hongshan culture 红山文化 (6,500-5,000 BP)
Xiaoheyan culture 小河沿文化‎ (5,000-4,000 BP)

Bronze Age cultures of the Xiliao River region are:

Lower Xiajiadian culture 夏家店下层文化 (4,000-3,200 BP)
Upper Xiajiadian culture 夏家店上层文化 (3,200-2,600 BP)

See also
Yangtze civilization
Yellow river civilization

References

History of Inner Mongolia
Neolithic cultures of China
History of Liaoning
History of Manchuria
7th-millennium BC establishments